Mmutlane, also known as Mmutlana, is a village in the Central District of Botswana. It is located 30 km north-west of Mahalapye, close to the village of Shoshong. Mmutlane has a primary school, and the population was 841 in the 2001 census.

References

Populated places in Central District (Botswana)
Villages in Botswana